Droids is a role-playing game published by Integral Games in 1983.

Description
Droids is a science-fiction robot role-playing game. The rules cover construction of droids (i.e., character creation), combat, droid society, encounters, and scenarios. The player characters are robots trying to survive after humanity destroyed their world.

Publication history
Droids: The Cybernetic Role-Playing Game was designed by Neil Patrick Moore, and published by Integral Games in 1983 as an 80-page digest-sized book.

Reception
Tony Watson reviewed Droids in Space Gamer No. 64. Watson commented that "Droids fails as an RPG.  A role-playing game requires more than a character generation system and rules for combat. Where the booklet might have some real applicability is as a design system for robots for existing SF RPGs such as Traveller and Star Frontiers. The rules provided for designing droids and the comprehensive listings of components are very good, but as an independent role-playing game, Droids is wide of the mark."

Reviews
Different Worlds #31 (Nov., 1983)

References

Role-playing games introduced in 1983
Science fiction role-playing games